In software engineering, structural design patterns are design patterns that ease the design by identifying a simple way to realize relationships among entities.

Examples of Structural Patterns include:

 Adapter pattern: 'adapts' one interface for a class into one that a client expects
 Adapter pipeline: Use multiple adapters for debugging purposes.
 Retrofit Interface Pattern: An adapter used as a new interface for multiple classes at the same time.
 Aggregate pattern: a version of the Composite pattern with methods for aggregation of children
 Bridge pattern: decouple an abstraction from its implementation so that the two can vary independently
 Tombstone: An intermediate "lookup" object contains the real location of an object.
 Composite pattern: a tree structure of objects where every object has the same interface
 Decorator pattern: add additional functionality to an object at runtime where subclassing would result in an exponential rise of new classes
 Extensibility pattern: a.k.a. Framework - hide complex code behind a simple interface
 Facade pattern: create a simplified interface of an existing interface to ease usage for common tasks
 Flyweight pattern: a large quantity of objects share a common properties object to save space
 Marker pattern: an empty interface to associate metadata with a class.
 Pipes and filters: a chain of processes where the output of each process is the input of the next
 Opaque pointer: a pointer to an undeclared or private type, to hide implementation details
 Proxy pattern: a class functioning as an interface to another thing

See also
 Behavioral pattern
 Concurrency pattern
 Creational pattern

References

Software design patterns
Articles with example Java code
Articles with example C Sharp code